Delias sacha is a butterfly in the family Pieridae. It was described by Henley Grose-Smith in 1895. It is found on the Wallace line, where it has been recorded from Obi.

The wingspan is about 74 mm. Adults are similar to Delias periboea and Delias fasciata, but larger.

References

External links
Delias at Markku Savela's Lepidoptera and Some Other Life Forms

sacha
Butterflies described in 1895